The Galleria Spada is a museum in Rome, which is housed in the Palazzo Spada on Piazza Capo di Ferro. The palazzo is also famous for its façade and for the forced perspective gallery by Francesco Borromini.

The gallery exhibits paintings from the 16th and 17th centuries. A state museum, it is managed by the Polo Museale del Lazio.

History 
The building now housing the Galleria Spada was originally built in 1540 for Cardinal Girolamo Capodiferro. Bartolomeo Baronino, of Casale Monferrato, was the architect, while Giulio Mazzoni and a team provided lavish stuccowork inside and out. The palazzo was purchased by Cardinal Spada in 1632. He commissioned the Baroque architect Francesco Borromini to modify it for him, and it was Borromini who created the masterpiece of forced perspective optical illusion in the arcaded courtyard, in which diminishing rows of columns and a rising floor create the visual illusion of a gallery 37 meters long (it is 8 meters) with a lifesize sculpture at the end of the vista, in daylight beyond; the sculpture is 60 cm high. Borromini was aided in his perspective trick by a mathematician.

The building was purchased in November 1926 by the Italian State to house the gallery and the State Council. The Galleria was opened in 1927 in the Palazzo Spada. It closed during the 1940s, but reopened in 1951 thanks to the efforts of the Conservator of the Galleries of Rome, Achille Bertini Calosso and the Director, Federico Zeri. Zeri was committed to locating the remaining artwork that had been scattered during the war, as he intended to recreate the original layout of the 16th–17th version of the gallery, including the placement of the pictures, the furniture and the sculptures. Most of the exhibited artwork comes predominantly from the private collection of Bernardino Spada, supplemented by smaller collections such as that of Virgilio Spada.

Description 
The museum is located on the first floor of Palazzo Spada, in the wing that used to belong to Cardinal Girolamo Capodiferro. The Cardinal had built the museum over the historical remains of his family's former home that had been established in 1548.
Room I
The room is called the Room of the Popes because of its fifty inscriptions describing the lives of select pontiffs, as commissioned by Cardinal Bernardino. It is also known as the Room with the Azure Ceiling because the ceiling is covered with a turquoise canvas divided into many little compartments marked "camerini da verno" (the local dialect camerini da verno is translated in Italian as camerini di inverno, 'winter cabins' in English). The ceiling coffers' decorations date back to 1777.

Among the paintings in this room are:

Portrait of Cardinal Bernardino Spada (1631) by Guido Reni
Portrait of Cardinal Bernardino Spada (1631) by Guercino
Portrait of Cardinal Fabrizio Spada (1643–1717) (1754) by Sebastiano Ceccarini
Two Still Lifes (1714) by Onofrio Loth
Four Ovidian mythological scenes by Giuseppe Chiari
Apollo and Daphne
Latona curses the Lycians transforming them into Frogs
Mercury entrusts Bacchus to the Nymphs
Bacchus and Ariadne
Four vedute (landscapes) by Hendrik van Lint
Four battle scenes by Jacques Courtois

Room II
This room was created along with Room III. The upper part of the walls were decorated with friezes in tempera on canvas by Perino del Vaga. The other parts of the walls that were originally painted with paneling are now missing.

Among the works in this room are:
Fresco frieze (1542) by Perino del Vaga, now replaced by friezes (1635) by Andrea Gennaroli and (1636) by François Perrier
Road to Calvary (c. 1500) by Marco Palmezzano
Portrait of a Botanist, Nobleman, and King David (1570) by Bartolomeo Passerotti
Portrait of a Violinist (c. 1515) by Titian
Four Stories of the Old Testament by Andrea Donducci
Some Madonnas (16th century) by the Umbrian School
The Visitation by Andrea del Sarto
Portrait of Pope Julius III (c. 1550) by Girolamo Siciolante da Sermoneta
Saint Cristopher and Saint Luke (c. 1510) by Amico Aspertini

Room III
This room is called the "Gallery of the Cardinal". It was designed by Paolo Maruscelli in 1636 and 1637, together with Room II, to house the art collection of Bernardino Spada. The ceiling is beamed and French windows lead into galleries, one of which has an iron railing overlooking the large garden.

Among the paintings here are:
Frescoes depicting Allegories of the Four Continents, Elements, and Seasons; Trophies and Armor; scenes from Ovid's Metamorphoses in Frieze (1698–1699) by Michelangelo Ricciolini
Allegory of Architecture, Sculpture and Painting offering gifts to Minerva, protector of Arts also by Ricciolini 
Landscape with Deer-hunt (1550–1560) by Niccolò dell'Abate
Vestals (1670) by Ciro Ferri
Landscapes with Windmills (1607) by Jan Brueghel the Elder
The Kidnapping of Helen copy of original by Guido Reni, painted by Giacinto Campana
The Meeting of Mark Antony and Cleopatra (1702) by Francesco Trevisani
The Massacre of the Innocents and The Sacrifice of Iphiginea (circa 1640) by Pietro Testa
The Astronomers (1645) by Niccolò Tornioli
Triumph of the Name of Jesus (c. 1679), a sketch for the ceiling of the Gesù by Giovanni Battista Gaulli
The Death of Dido (1631) by Guercino

Room IV
This final room was built over a wooden gallery overlooking the large garden. It houses paintings by the Caravaggisti.

Artworks 
The most important artworks are:

 Michelangelo Cerquozzi: The Revolt of Masaniello
 Giovan Battista Gaulli (Baciccia):  Christ and the Samaritan
 Artemisia Gentileschi: Saint Cecilia; The Virgin and Child
 Orazio Gentileschi: David with the Head of Goliath
 Guercino: Portrait of Cardinal Bernardino Spada
 Giovanni Lanfranco: Cain and Abel
 Giovanni Andrea Donducci (Mastelletta): Tales
 Parmigianino (school): Three Heads
 Mattia Preti: Christ Tempted by Satan; Christ and the Woman Taken in Adultery
 Guido Reni: Portrait of Cardinal Bernardino Spada; Saint Jerome
 Pieter van Laer (il Bamboccio): Storm; Nocturne

Furthermore, work by:
 Peter Paul Rubens
 Albrecht Dürer
 Caravaggio
 Domenichino
 Annibale Carracci
 Salvator Rosa
 Francesco Solimena

The Heaven Globe and the Earth Globe, dating back to the first decades of 18th century, made by the Dutch cartographer Willem Blaeu, are also interesting highlights of the museum.

Gallery

See also
List of museums in Italy
Palazzo Spada

References

External links 
 

 
Art museums and galleries in Rome
National museums of Italy
Rome R. VII Regola